Johannes Frederik Janse Van Rensburg (known as Hans) (24 September 1898 – 25 September 1966) was a South African lawyer, and leader of the Ossewabrandwag.

He was born in Winburg and died in Cape Town, a descendant of the Loyalist Johannes Frederik Janse Van Rensburg. He received his MA in German from the University of Stellenbosch, and his bachelor's and doctorates in law from University of Pretoria.

Van Rensburg qualified as a solicitor and was hired as the personal secretary of Tielman Roos, the Minister of Justice. In 1933, he became Secretary of Justice (under Smuts as Minister). As Secretary, he traveled overseas. In Germany, he met Adolf Hitler, Hermann Göring, and other top Nazi officials. He was greatly impressed by Hitler's leadership and the discipline he observed in Germany.

In 1938, he helped organize the Ossewabrandwag as a vehicle for Afrikaner nationalism though often at odds with the National Party, the main driver of Afrikaner Nationalism. Van Rensburg was the commander general of the Ossewabrandwag from 1941 until 1952. Like most members of the Ossewabrandwag, he was regarded as a German sympathizer during the Second World War.

Van Rensburg died on 25 September 1966 in Cape Town, and was buried with military honors.

References

Further reading

1898 births
1966 deaths
Afrikaner nationalists
Afrikaner people
People from the Free State (province)
South African collaborators with Nazi Germany
South African people of Dutch descent
Stellenbosch University alumni
University of Pretoria alumni